The JSC Precision Engineering Design Bureau named after A. E. Nudelman, shortened to "KB Tochmash", is a missile design bureau located in Moscow. It was founded in 1934 under the designation OKB-16 under the leadership of Yakov Taubin, but after his arrest and execution, leadership fell to Alexander Nudelman, who would lead it until 1987.

Products
KB Tochmash has designed many weapon systems, including the following:

Gun systems
 Nudelman-Suranov NS-37 Autocannon
 Nudelman-Suranov NS-23 Autocannon
 Nudelman-Suranov NS-45 Autocannon
 Nudelman N-37 Autocannon
 Nudelman-Rikhter NR-23 Autocannon
 Nudelman-Rikhter NR-30 Autocannon
 Rikhter R-23 Autocannon
 Nudelman-Nemenov NN-30 CIWS
 AGS-17 Automatic Grenade Launcher

Rockets
 S-5
 S-8
 S-25

Anti-tank missiles
 3M11 Falanga
 9K112 Kobra

Anti-aircraft missile systems
SA-9 / 9K31 Strela-1 Self Propelled Air Defense Missile System,
SA-13 / 9K35 Strela-10 Tracked Air Defense Missile System,
9K35 Strela-10 in modified versions (M/M1/M2/M3 and M4),
Sosna-R Air Defense Missile System (successor to Strela-10),
Palma/Palash combined air defense gun and missile system close-in weapon system.

See also
Techmash

References

External links
 

Technology companies established in 1934
Defence companies of the Soviet Union
High Precision Systems
Companies based in Moscow
1934 establishments in the Soviet Union
Design bureaus
Research institutes in the Soviet Union